Anthophorula is a genus of bees in the family Apidae. There are more than 60 described species in Anthophorula.

Species
These 65 species belong to the genus Anthophorula:

 Anthophorula albata (Timberlake, 1947)
 Anthophorula albicans (Provancher, 1896)
 Anthophorula albovestita (Timberlake, 1947)
 Anthophorula albovittata (Cockerell, 1918)
 Anthophorula asteris (Mitchell, 1962)
 Anthophorula beameri (Timberlake, 1980)
 Anthophorula brevicornis (Timberlake, 1980)
 Anthophorula centralis (Timberlake, 1980)
 Anthophorula cerei (Timberlake, 1947)
 Anthophorula chionura (Cockerell, 1925)
 Anthophorula chlorina (Cockerell, 1918)
 Anthophorula cockerelli (Timberlake, 1980)
 Anthophorula compactula Cockerell, 1897
 Anthophorula completa (Cockerell, 1935)
 Anthophorula consobrina (Timberlake, 1980)
 Anthophorula cornigera (Cockerell, 1922)
 Anthophorula crassicornis (Timberlake, 1980)
 Anthophorula crenulata (Timberlake, 1980)
 Anthophorula deserticola (Timberlake, 1947)
 Anthophorula eriogoni (Timberlake, 1947)
 Anthophorula euphorbiae (Timberlake, 1947)
 Anthophorula exilis (Timberlake, 1980)
 Anthophorula fuscicornis (Timberlake, 1980)
 Anthophorula gracilicornis (Timberlake, 1980)
 Anthophorula gutierreziae (Timberlake, 1947)
 Anthophorula halli (Timberlake, 1980)
 Anthophorula ignota (Timberlake, 1980)
 Anthophorula imparilis (Timberlake, 1980)
 Anthophorula interrupta (Timberlake, 1980)
 Anthophorula laticincta (Timberlake, 1980)
 Anthophorula levigata (Timberlake, 1980)
 Anthophorula linsleyi (Timberlake, 1980)
 Anthophorula macrodonta González-Vaquero & Roig-Alsina, 2005
 Anthophorula micheneri (Timberlake, 1947)
 Anthophorula minima (Timberlake, 1980)
 Anthophorula morgani Cockerell, 1914
 Anthophorula morula (Timberlake, 1980)
 Anthophorula nevadensis (Timberlake, 1980)
 Anthophorula nitens (Cockerell, 1915)
 Anthophorula niveata (Friese, 1908)
 Anthophorula oaxacana (Timberlake, 1980)
 Anthophorula pallidicornis (Timberlake, 1980)
 Anthophorula palmarum (Timberlake, 1947)
 Anthophorula parva (Timberlake, 1980)
 Anthophorula punctatissima (Timberlake, 1980)
 Anthophorula pygmaea (Cresson, 1872)
 Anthophorula robustula (Timberlake, 1980)
 Anthophorula rozeni (Timberlake, 1980)
 Anthophorula rufiventris (Timberlake, 1947)
 Anthophorula scapalis (Timberlake, 1980)
 Anthophorula sculleni (Timberlake, 1980)
 Anthophorula serrata (Friese, 1899)
 Anthophorula sidae (Cockerell, 1897)
 Anthophorula snellingi (Timberlake, 1980)
 Anthophorula sonorensis (Timberlake, 1980)
 Anthophorula subcrassicornis (Timberlake, 1980)
 Anthophorula texana (Friese, 1899)
 Anthophorula torticornis (Cockerell, 1927)
 Anthophorula tricinctula (Timberlake, 1980)
 Anthophorula truncata González-Vaquero & Roig-Alsina, 2005
 Anthophorula uncicornis González-Vaquero & Roig-Alsina, 2005
 Anthophorula unicornis González-Vaquero & Roig-Alsina, 2005
 Anthophorula varleyi (Timberlake, 1947)
 Anthophorula yoloensis (Timberlake, 1980)
 † Anthophorula persephone Engel, 2012

References

Further reading

External links

 

Apinae
Articles created by Qbugbot